Ilia Grigoryevich Chernousov (born 7 August 1986) is a Russian cross-country skier. He won bronze medals at the 2011 World Championships and 2014 Winter Olympics.

Career
Chernousov's first World Cup victory was in the 4×10 km relay in Switzerland in 2007. His best individual results came in the 30 km pursuit in 2011: a third place at the world championship and the first place at the world cup. At the FIS Nordic World Ski Championships 2007 in Sapporo, he finished 31st in the 15 km + 15 km double pursuit event.

At the 2014 Olympics Chernousov finished third in the 50 km freestyle. He was promoted to the first placed after the ban of gold and silver medalists, Alexander Legkov and Maxim Vylegzhanin. This decision was reversed in 2018. In the 30 km skiathlon Chernousov placed fifth. 

In June 2014 Chernousov married the Swiss biathlete and fellow Olympic medalist Selina Gasparin.

Cross-country skiing results
All results are sourced from the International Ski Federation (FIS).

Olympic Games
 1 medal – (1 bronze)

World Championships
 1 medal – (1 bronze)

World Cup

Season standings

Individual podiums
2 victories – (1 , 1 ) 
9 podiums – (7 , 2 )

Team podiums
 1 victory – (1 )
 3 podiums – (3 )

References

External links
 
 
 
 

1986 births
Living people
Russian male cross-country skiers
Tour de Ski skiers
FIS Nordic World Ski Championships medalists in cross-country skiing
Cross-country skiers at the 2014 Winter Olympics
Olympic cross-country skiers of Russia
Medalists at the 2014 Winter Olympics
Olympic bronze medalists for Russia
Olympic medalists in cross-country skiing
Sportspeople from Novosibirsk